Henri Szeps OAM, (born 2 October 1943) alternatively Henry Szeps, is an Australian character actor of theatre and television. He has also featured in films and worked in voice roles, and has worked in productions in the United Kingdom.

Early life 
Szeps was born in Lausanne, Switzerland to Polish parents. Due to the German invasion of Poland during World War II, his parents fled to France in 1938. His father left the family to join the French Resistance. In 1943, his mother and three-year-old sister made their way to a refugee camp in Lausanne, where Henri was born. At 1 months he was fostered to a Swiss couple in Blumenstein. His mother reclaimed him when he was three years old, and returned to the Swiss couple when he was 4. He was reclaimed by his mother to Paris, and due to her illness, at the age of six was placed at the Rothschild Orphanage. He came to Sydney, Australia at the age of eight in 1951 or 1952 with his mother and sister.

Career 
Szeps studied acting at Ensemble Theatre during weekends, under the direction of Hayes Gordon, while gaining science and electrical engineering degrees at Sydney University. In 1963, while sitting for the BSc in maths and physics during the day he was appearing every night at the Ensemble Theatre in his first play there, called The Physicists, which ran for six months.

Szeps is probably best known for his role as selfish dentist Robert Beare in the classic Australian television comedy series Mother and Son (1984 to 1994), with Garry McDonald, Ruth Cracknell and Judy Morris. Another prominent role was in Palace of Dreams for which he received a Penguin Award.
He played the Doctor in the world première of David Williamson's play, Travelling North, and was asked to repeat the performance in the 1987 film, with Leo McKern & Graham Kennedy.

He appeared in 1981 TV movie A Step in the Right Direction.

Szeps won the Penguin Award for best actor for ABC's 10 part series Palace of Dreams.

He has performed in five one-man shows, produced by the Ensemble Theatre, the last three self-penned: The Double Bass (1990), Sky (1992) (written for him by John Misto, I'm Not a Dentist (1997), Why Kids (2003) and Wish I'd Said That (2010).

He has written a book on acting, All in Good Timing (1996), which is used by drama schools.

Honours and awards

Filmography

Personal life 
He met his wife of 47 years, New Zealand Australian actress Mary Ann Severne, during the Sydney season of The Boys in the Band, and they were married soon after. They have two sons, one of whom is Josh Szeps, a media personality and current afternoon presenter on ABC Radio Sydney. He is the former co-host of Weekend Breakfast on the Australian ABC News 24 channel.

References

External links 
 
 Henri Szeps Webpage

Australian male television actors
Australian male stage actors
Australian male film actors
Helpmann Award winners
Recipients of the Medal of the Order of Australia
Australian people of French descent
Australian people of Polish-Jewish descent
1943 births
Living people
Drama teachers
Swiss emigrants to Australia
Swiss people of French descent
Swiss people of Polish-Jewish descent
Swiss Jews
People from Lausanne
Australian Jews
20th-century Australian male actors
People with Alzheimer's disease